Pieter Georges van Straaten (born 23 October 1992) is a French field hockey player who plays as a forward for Belgian Hockey League club Antwerp and the French national team.

Career

Under–21
Pieter van Straaten debuted for the France U–21 team in 2012 at the EuroHockey Junior Championship in 's-Hertogenbosch.

The following year he went on to represent the team at the FIH Junior World Cup in New Delhi. At the tournament he won a silver medal, a history making performance for the French team.

Senior national team
Van Straaten made his debut for the French national team in 2012.

In 2018, he was represented his country at the FIH World Cup in Bhubaneswar.

Since his debut, Pieter van Straaten has been a regular fixture in the national squad. He won his first major medal with the senior team in 2019 at the FIH Series Finals in Le Touquet, taking home a gold medal.

He was a member of the national team at the 2021 EuroHockey Championships in Amsterdam, and was also named in the French squad for the 2021–22 FIH Pro League.

References

External links

1992 births
Living people
French male field hockey players
Dutch male field hockey players
People from Leiderdorp
Male field hockey forwards
Waterloo Ducks H.C. players
Haagsche Delftsche Mixed players
Men's Belgian Hockey League players
Men's Hoofdklasse Hockey players
2018 Men's Hockey World Cup players
Sportspeople from South Holland
2023 Men's FIH Hockey World Cup players